Western Slope is a neighborhood in The Heights, Jersey City, New Jersey on the cuesta, or gradual decline, of the western side of the New Jersey Palisades between  The Boulevard and Tonnele Avenue.

Its southern border is generally considered to be Beach Street near The Divided Highway and ramp leading to Tonnelle Circle.
Its northern border is near Transfer Station, the district of Hudson County, New Jersey where Secaucus Road, Kennedy Boulevard, and  Paterson Plank Road, intersect and where the borders of Jersey City Heights, North Bergen, New Jersey, and Union City, New Jersey meet at one point. Some streets of Western Slope keep their names as they cross over the city line into North Bergen. 

From the Tonnelle Avenue at Route 139,  Tonnelle Avenue Avenue through Western Slope is also known as U.S. Route 1/9 between the Holland and Lincoln tunnels, and is dotted with motels and gas stations, and a White Manna. Some effects from erosion resulting from continued development can be seen along the eastern side of Tonnelle Avenue Avenue.  The area along Tonnelle Avenue Avenue is industrial and commercial, whereas the blocks rising to the east are residential.

Leonard Gordon Park at Manhattan Avenue is a neighborhood park and site of a larger than life 1907 sculpture referred to as Buffalo and Bears by Solon Hannibal Borglum. 

Sparrow Hill is a  neighborhood is a six block stretch of Liberty Avenue between Spruce Street and Manhattan Avenue.

References

External links
Jersey City Independent Neighborhood Focus

Neighborhoods in Jersey City, New Jersey